Vinson is a surname, and may refer to:

People
 Amber Vinson, U.S. nurse who as a victim in the U.S. of the 2014 West African Ebola outbreak 
 Carl Vinson, politician
 Clarence Vinson, boxer
 Eddie Vinson, musician
 Fernandus Vinson, American football player
 Fred M. Vinson, Chief Justice of the United States
 Fred Vinson (American football), football player
 Fred Vinson (basketball), basketball player
 Helen Vinson, actress
 Maribel Vinson, figure skater
 Mose Vinson (1917–2002), American boogie-woogie, blues and jazz pianist and singer
 Roger Vinson, U.S. judge
 Sharni Vinson, actress
 Sigolène Vinson, novelist, Charlie Hebdo journalist
 Walter Vinson (1901–1975), American Memphis blues guitarist, singer and songwriter

Familial groups
 Vinson political family (USA)

References

See also
 Vinson (disambiguation)
 Fred Vinson (disambiguation)

de:Vinson
fr:Vinson
ja:ヴィンソン